Antoinette Tidjani Alou is a Jamaican-Nigerien academic, film-maker and writer, whose work focuses on the constructions of Sahelian identity in written and oral literature, as well as women in Sahelian identities. She published a novel On m'appelle Nina in 2016 and a collection of poems with a memoir Tina shot me between the eyes and other stories in 2017. She is a lecturer in Comparative Literature and in 2016 was appointed Coordinator of the Arts and Culture Department at Abdou Moumouni University in Niger.

Early life and education
Antoinette Tidjani Alou was born in Jamaica and her secondary education took place at Convent of Mercy Academy 'Aplaha' in Kingston. She studied at the University of the West Indies in Kingston where she obtained a Bachelor of Arts degree. She continued her studies and was awarded a doctorate at the University Michel de Montaigne-Bordeaux 3. She defended her thesis in 1991 on the dramatic works of Paul Claudel.

Teaching and research 
Tidjani Alou began teaching French and comparative literature at Abdou Moumouni University in Niamey in 1994. She is a lecturer in Comparative Literature and in 2016 was appointed Coordinator of the Arts and Culture Department. Her research focuses on the constructions of Sahelian identity in written and oral literature, as well as the political constructions of identity. She is also an expert on depictions of the mytho-historical figure of Sarraounia.

In 2006, she was appointed president of the International Association for Oral Literature of Africa (ISOLA), a position she held for eight years. She has worked on the Women Writing Africa Project and is a member of the research group Literature, Gender and Development: Nigerien Visions and Perspectives.

Literary career
Between her childhood in Jamaica, her university education in France, and her professional life in Niger, Tidjani Alou has adapted to different cultures. She published her first novel, On m'appelle Nina in 2016 with Présence Africaine. This autofiction retraces the journey of a woman, Vilhelminma, who leaves Jamaica to settle for love in Niger. The character finds herself confronted with a society that refuses to open up to her, considers her as a foreigner - a “white black”. She also deals with the variations of pain, trauma and bereavement, as the character has to deal with the death of her 16-year-old child. It drew comparisons with the works of Maryse Conde.

The following year, she published Tina shot me between the eyes and other stories, a collection of poems and a memoir, with the Senegalese publisher Amalion. In it she explores how the self is shaped and transformed by our relationships. She is also a freelance translator and screenwriter. She collaborated with the Cameroonian filmmaker Jean-Marie Teno in 2010 to write for the film Toutes voiles dehors.

Selected publications

Creative writing 

 On m'appelle Nina (Présence Africaine, 2016)
 Tina Shot Me Between the Eyes (Amalion, 2017)

Academic works 
 Alou, Antoinette Tidjani. "Myths of a New World in Édouard Glissant's novels La Lézarde and Le Quatrième siècle." Tydskrif vir letterkunde 44.2 (2007): 163-187.
 Alou, Antoinette Tidjani. "Niger and Sarraounia: One Hundred Years of Forgetting Female Leadership." Research in African Literatures, vol. 40 no. 1, 2009, p. 42-56. 
 Alou, Antoinette Tidjani, Arinpe Gbekelolu Adejumo, and Asonzeh Ukah. Africans and the politics of popular culture. Vol. 42. University Rochester Press, 2009.
 Tidjani Alou, Antoinette. "Ancestors from the East, Spirits from the West. Surviving and Reconfiguring the Exogenous Violence of Global Encounters in the Sahel." Journal des africanistes 80-1/2 (2010): 75-92.
 Tidjani-Alou, Antoinette. “‘Back to Africa, Miss Mattie?’: Autobiographical Notes from Global Africa on Apprehending Texts and Subtexts of Popular                    Culture.” The Global South, vol. 5, no. 2, 2011, pp. 139–53.
 Alou, Antoinette Tidjani, and Jean-Pierre Olivier de Sardan. Epistemology, fieldwork, and anthropology. Springer, 2016.
 Alou, Antoinette Tidjani. "Reel Resistance: the Cinema of Jean-Marie Teno." Tydskrif vir Letterkunde 57.2 (2020): 113-114.
 Alou, Antoinette Tidjani. "Sarraounia, love, and the postcolony." Tydskrif vir Letterkunde 59.3 (2022): 27-34.

References

External links 

 PROFESSOR ANTOINETTE TIDJANI ALOU: VOICE OF NIGERIEN WOMEN (profile/interview)
 Women from the Nigerien Sahel (Library of Congress talk)
 Writers I Read: In Conversation with Antoinette Tidjani Alou (interview)
 ENTRE LES LIGNES - Niger: Antoinette Tidjani Alou, écrivaine (reading excerpt in French)
 EPISODE 97 WOMAN OF THE MONTH - ANTOINETTE TIDJANI ALOU (podcast)

Year of birth missing (living people)
Living people
Jamaican diaspora
Nigerien women writers
Nigerien academics
Jamaican women writers
University of the West Indies alumni
Bordeaux Montaigne University alumni
Academic staff of Abdou Moumouni University